The International Mixed Martial Arts Federation (IMMAF) was founded on 29 February 2012 as the international governing body for amateur Mixed Martial Arts (MMA). Registered as a non-profit organisation under Swedish law, IMMAF serves as a democratic hub for national MMA federations and supports the growth of regulation and sport safety globally by aiding countries in the formation of federations where none exist. IMMAF launched with support of market leader, the Ultimate Fighting Championship (UFC). The UFC is among promotions sanctioned by federations under the IMMAF umbrella in countries that include Brazil and Sweden.

IMMAF now is in Switzerland (Roveredo via Toveda n. 3) near Swiss Mixed Martial Arts Federation, who oversaw the transfer in all administrative aspects.

After the 2022 Russian invasion of Ukraine the IMMAF suspended the memberships of the Russian MMA Union and the Federation of Hand-to-Hand Fighting & MMA of Belarus. It barred the Russian and Belarusian federations from participating in all IMMAF Championships, and banned the organisation of IMMAF events in Russia and Belarus.

Amateur vs. professional level athletes 
The IMMAF considers an athlete to be on a professional level and thus not eligible for participation if he or she meets any one of the following criteria:
 holds a Pro MMA or professional combat sports license issued by any sanctioning body
 is under contract with a professional MMA or professional combat sport promotion
 has received a fee for participating in an MMA or professional combat sports match
 has participated in a professional MMA match under the Unified Rules of MMA or equivalent in the country where the bout took place
 has competed against an opponent with a Pro MMA record at the time the bout took place
 has a professional MMA fight record published anywhere
 National amateur criteria do not hold for IMMAF international competition if it does not conform to the above stipulations

Amateur MMA rules

Compulsory equipment 
 Competition gloves
 Competition shin guards
 Competition shorts made in a durable material and designed in such a way that they can't inflict injury on either one of the contestants
 Mouthpiece
 Competition top or rashguard (women only)
 Protective groin cup (optional for women, compulsory for men)
 Protective chest gear (optional for women, not applicable for men)
 Knee protection (optional)
 Ankle protection  (optional)

Unauthorized techniques 
The same from the Unified Rules of MMA plus:
 Elbow and forearm strikes of any kind
 Heel hook
 Twisters/Sit through crucifix and/or any submission deemed as applying pressure to the spine
 Knees to the head at any point

Length of the match 
 A match shall contain three rounds. 
 A round shall last three minutes.
 The round break shall last sixty seconds

Suspension 
A contestant who was knocked out as a result of a blow to the head, or whose match  was stopped by the judge because of several tough  blows to the head which have made him/her defenseless and unable to continue, shall be suspended from competition and sparring matches.

Suspension periods starting from the day of the latest match:
 One knockout: Minimum four weeks suspension
 Two knockouts during a period of three months: Minimum three months suspension.
 Three knockouts during a period of twelve months: Minimum twelve months suspension.

Listed suspension periods are minimum periods and can be extended at the physician's 
discretion.

In the event that a match was not stopped the physician still has the right to decide on a suspension if he/she deems it necessary due to the contestant having received many tough blows to the head

Members 
National Federations:

Pan America

Arrgentina - Argentine Association of Mixed Martial Arts and Contact Sports
Aruba - Millard Academy
Bahamas - Empire Mixed Martial Arts Bahamas
Barbados - Barbados Mixed Martial Arts Federation (BMMAF)
Belize - MMA Federation of Belize
Bolivia - MMA Federation of Belize
Brazil - Brazilian MMA Athletic Commission / Comissão Atlética Brasileira de MMA (CABMMA)
Canada - Canadian Combat Alliance
Cayman Islands - Under Review
Colombia - Asociación Colombiana de Artes Marciales Mixtas (OCAMM)
Costa Rica - Federacion de Artes Marciales Mixtas
Dominican Republic - Federation Dominicana de Artes Marciale Mixtas
Ecuador - Ecuador Mixed Martial Arts Federation (EMMAF)
El Salvador - Federacion Salvadoreña de Kickboxing & MMA / Salvadorean Kickboxing & MMA Federation (presiding over Commission Salvadoreña de Artes Marciales Mixtas / Salvadorean Mixed Martial Arts Commission)
Grenada - Grenada mixed martial arts federation
Guatemala - Asociación Guatemalteca de Artes Marciales Mixtas
Guyana - Guyana Mixed Martials Federation
Jamaica - MMA Jamaica Sports Federation
Mexico - Federacion de Artes Marciales Mixtas Equidad y Juego Limpio
Panama - Asociación Nacional de mixed martial arts
Paraguay -  Federacion Paraguaya de Kick Boxing Muay Thai & MMA
Puerto Rico - Federacion Independiente de Artes Marciales Mixtas de Puerto Rico (FIAMMPR)
Saint Martin - Sint Maarten Martial Arts
St Lucia - St Lucia Mixed Martial Arts Federation
Trinidad and Tobago - Trinidad and Tobago Mixed Martial Arts Federation (TNT MMAF)
Uruguay - Asociacion Uruguaya de Artes Marciales Mixtas Amateur y Profesional – AUAMMAP
United States of America - USA Mixed Martial Arts Federation
Venezuela - Federación Venezolana de Artes Marciales Mixtas (FEVAMM) National

Asia

Afghanistan - Afghanistan MMA Federation (AMMAF)
Bahrain - Bahrain Mixed Martial Arts Federation
China - MMA Department Of Chinese Boxing Federation
Hong Kong - Hong Kong MMA Federation Ltd
India -  MMA India
Indonesia - Indonesia Committee for Martial Art Sports / Komite Olahraga Beladiri Indonesia – KOBI
Iran - Iranian MMA Federation (IRMMAF)
Iraq - Iraq Champion Fighting Cage (ICFC)
Japan - Japan MMA Federation JMMAF
Jordan - Jordan Mixed Martial Arts Federation
Kazakhstan - Kazakh National Public Union of Mixed Martial Arts (MMA) Federation
Kuwait - MMA Kuwait Association
Kyrgyzstan - Republic Of Kyrgyzstan Federation Of MMA And Pankration
Lebanon - Lebanese MMA Federation
Malaysia - Malaysia Mixed Martial Arts Association (MASMMAA)
Mongolia - Mongolian Mixed Martial Arts Federation
Nepal - Nepal National Martial Art Games Confederation
Pakistan - Mixed Martial Arts Pakistan (PAKMMA)
Philippines - Philippines Mixed Martial Arts Federation
Saudi Arabia - Saudi Mixed Martial Arts Federation
Singapore - Under Review
South Korea - Under Review
Sri Lanka - Mixed Martial Arts Federation Sri Lanka
Taiwan - Chinese Taipei Mixed Martial Arts Association
Tajikistan - Federation Of Mixed Martial Arts Of The Republic Of Tajikistan
Thailand - Thai Mixed Martial Arts Federation (TMMAF)
United Arab Emirates - UAE Jiu-Jitsu and Mixed Martial Arts Federation
Uzbekistan - Uzbekistan MMA Association
Vietnam - Vietnam MMA Federation

Europe

Albania - Albanian Free Fighting Federation
Armenia - MMA Federation of Armenia
Austria - Austrian Mixed Martial Arts Federation
Azerbaijan - Azerbaijan Mixed Martial Arts Federation
Belgium - Belgian Mixed Martial Arts Federation
Bulgaria - Bulgarian Mixed Martial Arts Federation (BULMMAF)
Croatia - Croatian Mixed Martial Arts Union (HMMAU)
Cyprus - Cyprus Mixed Martial Arts Federation (CMMAF)
Czech Republic - Czech Association of MMA
Denmark - Danish Mixed Martial Arts Federation
England - England Mixed Martial Arts Association
Estonia - Estonian Mixed Martial Arts Federation
Finland - Finnish Mixed Martial Arts Federation / Suomen Vapaaotteluliitto ry
France - Federation Francaise de Boxe
Georgia - National Federation of Universal Martial Arts
Germany - German Mixed Martial Arts Federation (GEMMAF)
Greece -  Panhellenic MMA Federation
Hungary - Hungarian MMA Federation (HMMAF)
Iceland - Iceland MMA Federation
Ireland - Irish Mixed Martial Arts Association (IMMAA)
Israel- ISR Mixed Martial Arts
Italy - Federazione Italiana Grappling Mixed Martial Arts / Italian Grappling and Mixed Martial Arts Federation (FIGMMA)
 Kosovo - Kosovo Miksed Martial Arts Federation / Federation Federata Arteve Mikse Marciale
Latvia - Under Review
Lithuania - Lithuanian Mixed Martial Arts Federation
Luxembourg - Fédération Luxembourgeoise de MMA (FLMMA)
Malta - Malta Mixed Martial Arts Association
Moldova - Moldovan MMA Federation
Netherlands - Netherlands MMA Federation
Northern Ireland - Ulster Amateur MMA
Norway - Norwegian Mixed Martial Arts Federation
Poland - Stowarzyszenie MMA Polska
Portugal - Federação Portugusea de Lutas Amadoras (FPLA) / Comissão Atlética Portuguesa de MMA (CAPMMA)
Romania -  Romanian Kempo Mixed Martial Arts Federation (RKMMAF)
Russia - Russian MMA Union (suspended)
Scotland - Mixed Martial Arts Federation Of Scotland
Serbia - Serbian MMA Federation
Slovakia - Slovakian MMA Association
Slovenia - Slovenia MMA Federation
Spain - Federación Española de Lucha Olímpica y Disciplinas Asociadas (FELUCHA-IMMAF)
Sweden -  Swedish Mixed Martial Arts Federation
Switzerland - Federation Switzerland Mixed Martial Arts
Turkey - Turkey Combat Mixed Martial Arts Sport Association
Ukraine - MMA League of Ukraine
Wales - Mixed Martial Arts Cymru

Oceania

Australia - International Mixed Martial Arts Federation of Australia
French Polynesia - Wrestling Polynesian Federation & Associated Disciplines
New Zealand - New Zealand Mixed Martial Arts Federation

Africa

Algeria - Algerian Federation of Kickboxing, MMA & Similar Sports
Angola - Associação Provincial de MMA de Luanda
Cameroon -  National League Mixed Martial Arts Cameroon (NLMMAC)
Cote D Ivoire - Federation Ivoirienne D Arts Martiaux Mixtes
Democratic Republic of Congo - Democratic Republic of Congo MMA Federation (DRCMMAF)
Egypt -  The Egyptian MMA Committee
Ghana - Ghana Mixed Martial Arts Federation (GHAMMAF)
Guinea - Guinean Federation of Krav-Maga and Associated Disciplines (MMA)
Mauritius - Mixed Martial Arts Federation Mauritius
Morocco - Fédération Royale Marocaine Du Sport de Combat Libre Et Mixte (FRMSCLM)
Namibia - Namibian MMA Federation
 Nigeria - Nigerian Mixed Martial Arts Federation
Senegal - MMA Senegal
The Seychelles - The Seychelles Mixed Martial Arts Association
South Africa - Mixed Martial Arts South Africa (MMASA)
Tunisia - Tunisian Mixed Martial Arts Federation
Zambia - Mixed Martial Arts Zambia
Zimbabwe - Mixed Martial Arts Association (ZMMMA)

Championships

World Championships
 2014 IMMAF World Championships
 2015 IMMAF World Championships
 2016 IMMAF World Championships
 2017 IMMAF World Championships
 2018 IMMAF World Championships
 2019 IMMAF World Championships
 2021 IMMAF World Championships

Youth World Championships
 2019 IMMAF Youth World Championships
 2021 IMMAF Youth World Championships
 2022 IMMAF Youth World Championships

Junior World Championships
 2019 IMMAF Junior World Championships

World Cup 
 2021 IMMAF World Cup

Super Cup 
 2022 MMA Super Cup

European Championships 
 2015 IMMAF European Open Championship
 2016 IMMAF European Open Championships
 2017 IMMAF European Open Championships
 2018 IMMAF European Open Championships
 2019 IMMAF European Open Championships
 2021 IMMAF European Open Championships
 2022 IMMAF European Open Championships

African Championships 
 2016 IMMAF Africa Open Championships
 2017 IMMAF Africa Open Championships
 2018 IMMAF Africa Open Championships
 2019 IMMAF Africa Open Championships
 2022 IMMAF Africa Open Championships

Asian Championships 
 2017 IMMAF Asian Open Championships
 2019 IMMAF Asian Open Championships
 2022 IMMAF Asian Open Championships

Oceanian Championships 
 2018 IMMAF Oceania Open Championships
 2019 IMMAF Oceania Open Championships
 2020 IMMAF Oceania Open Championships

Pan American Championships 
 2019 Pan American Open Championships
 2022 Pan American Open Championships

Overall Medals Standing (World Championships) 
Totals do not include medals from the 2016 or 2017 World Championships.

References

External links

 
Sports governing bodies in Switzerland
International sports organizations
Sports organizations established in 2012
Mixed martial arts organizations